Purpura of the nail beds usually result from trauma, with causes of toe involvement including physical pressure on the toes, such as that seen in surfboarding or windsurfing in which one must maintain balance with the toes, or when exogenous pressure is exerted from poorly fitting shoes.  Purpura beneath the nails may present similar to a melanoma, a confusion that may result if the patient does not communicate the acuteness of onset.

See also 
 Nail anatomy
 List of cutaneous conditions

References

 
Conditions of the skin appendages